Dwando (The conflict) is a 2009 Indian Bengali film. The film was directed by Suman Ghosh. According to Telegraph review, the film is inspired by Krzysztof Kieslowski’s Decalogue II. This was Suman Ghosh's second film after Podokkhep.

Theme 
The film which the director has called a "serious film" is a psychological drama that deals with dilemma of a woman. In the director's own words "I have always felt that a film should be something more than just a slice of life. In Ananya’s ethical dilemma we get the larger picture of how we can mould our behavioural pattern when some extraordinary events happen."

Plot 
Sudipta is married for 10 years to Anik but the couple don't have any child and the marriage has turned cold. When Anik is away for an office trip, Sudipta gets attracted towards a young NRI Rana. Anik comes back and suspects something wrong.
It is found Anik is suffering from Brain Tumour and he is admitted to hospital for treatment under surgeon Dr Ashok Mukherjee.
Anik’s physical condition gets worse. At this time Sudipta discovers she is pregnant. Sudipta, on one hand loves her husband Anik and on the other hand loves Rana and wants to give birth to the child, faces a moral dilemma.
At a stormy night Sudipta goes to Dr. Ashok Mukherjee to know the health condition (chances of living) of Anik on which her decision will depend.
Her dilemma is ultimately resolved by Dr. Mukherjee letting love triumph over everything else.

Credits

Cast 
 Soumitra Chatterjee as Dr. Mukherjee
 Ananya Chatterjee as Sudipta
 Kaushik Sen as Anik
 Samrat Chakrabarti as Rana

Crew 
 Director: Suman Ghosh
 Production: Suman Ghosh Productions
 Cinematographer: Barun Mukherjee
 Music: Mayookh Bhaumik
 Chief assistant director: Avijit Chaudhuri
 Sound designer: Partha Barman
 Art director: Tanmoy Chakraborty
 Editor: Sujay Duttaroy
 Costumes and Production stylist: Anandi Ghosh
 Production Controller: Saubhik Das

Soundtrack

See also 
 Waarish
 Nobel Chor

References

External links 
 
 

2009 films
Bengali-language Indian films
2000s Bengali-language films